Kota Kinabalu Court Complex is a court complex located on a 2.5 hectares (6.25-acre) site land atop Punai Hill in Kota Kinabalu, Sabah, Malaysia.

History 
The new court complex began to be constructed on 22 July 2014 through federal-funded project since its groundbreaking in April of the same year at a cost of RM177 million as the replacement of an old single high court building before it was completed in 2018. Although the construction completion was delayed for another few months, the developer managed to saved about RM1.4 million from the RM177 allocation by the federal government. In April 2019, the Integrated Court System (ICS) being installed on the complex to improve court management.

Features 
The new complex design combining three Sabah's ethnic elements, namely the Kadazan-Dusun, Bajau Laut and Murut that also incorporated motifs of the country national flower of Hibiscus rosa-sinensis (Chinese hibiscus), and Sabah's official flower of Rafflesia. The exterior incorporated similar resemblance to the Palace of Justice at Putrajaya. Inside the complex, it has three High Courts, six Magistrates' courts, six Sessions Courts including the Child Sexual Offence Court and a Federal Court.

References 

Buildings and structures in Kota Kinabalu